is an action-platform video game developed and published by Capcom. It is a spin-off game in the original Mega Man series and was originally released in Japan for the Super Famicom on April 24, 1998. It was later ported to the Game Boy Advance (GBA) handheld in 2002, and localized in English and released the following year.

After defeating the evil Dr. Wily many times, the robotic hero Mega Man is called into action once again when a powerful being known as King steals the blueprints to the creations of Dr. Wily and Dr. Light in order to create an army for robotic dominance over humans. Having learned of the threat, Mega Man's rival Bass decides to take matters into his own hands. The game is an action-platformer where the player advances by defeating bosses and acquiring their signature weapons. Mega Man & Bass lets the player choose between either of its title characters, each of which plays differently from the other.

Mega Man & Bass debuted on the aging 16-bit Super Famicom despite the series having already transitioned to the PlayStation and Sega Saturn with Mega Man 8. Producer Keiji Inafune claimed Mega Man & Bass was created with regard to younger players who did not yet own one of the more advanced gaming systems. The game received positive remarks from critics for its graphics and use of a tried-and-true gameplay formula, though many found the difficulty to be too steep. Although Mega Man & Bass shares many traits with previous console games in the series, Mega Man 9 would not be released until 2008.

Plot
The story of Mega Man & Bass varies slightly depending on which player character is chosen. It begins one year after the events of Mega Man 8 when a robot villain named King breaks into Dr. Wily's laboratory and then the Robot Museum to collect the data blueprints for the creations of Dr. Light. Dr. Light alerts the hero Mega Man that he must go at once to the Robot Museum to confront this new enemy. Meanwhile, Bass (Mega Man's rival and Wily's greatest creation) hears of the new criminal's appearance and decides to prove himself the stronger robot by defeating King. Proto Man is the first to arrive at the scene. King divulges his plan to him; he desires to create a utopia in which robots rule the world over humans. To accomplish this, King seeks to create an unstoppable army using the data and invites Proto Man to join him. Proto Man refuses and attempts to attack, but King counters and slices his body in half. Proto Man then teleports back to the lab for repairs while King escapes with the data, instructing his minions to handle the heroes. With their own motivations, Mega Man and Bass set out to put a stop to King's plans.

After vanquishing eight powerful robots under allegiance to King, the duo infiltrates his castle and engages him in combat. Proto Man interrupts the fight and again attempts to defeat their new nemesis. Putting all of his remaining energy into a blast, Proto Man manages to destroy King's shield and loses consciousness, allowing Mega Man and Bass to best King in battle afterwards. King questions why they fight so hard for humans when robots are the superior species. The pair explains that humans are the ones who created robots in the first place, which confuses King, who teleported Proto Man out of his castle after the battle. The villain reveals that his creator is Dr. Wily, who then appears on a video monitor. When King asks the evil inventor why robots fight each other for the sake of humans, Wily strengthens his "brainwashing level" and restores his power. Mega Man and Bass engage King in another battle and defeat him. The castle begins a self-destruct sequence and the protagonists escape without King.

Mega Man and Bass confront Dr. Wily in his newly regained laboratory. When Wily is beaten, Bass demands to know why he deceived him. Wily explains that he created King simply to test Bass' abilities. Wily shows him written plans for making a newer version of King to join with Bass in this venture, promising that the two would be invincible together. Proto Man appears and immediately destroys these plans. Wily then demands Bass to destroy Proto Man, but Bass is unsure. Proto Man tells Bass that although he is a strong robot of free will, he can never defeat his rival because he has nothing for which to fight. Bass doesn't care and forces Proto Man to leave, saying that he will still destroy Mega Man to prove his cause. Mega Man returns home where his sister Roll presents him a letter from King, who has somehow escaped the destruction of his castle. King wishes to atone for his own crimes against humans and hopes for them to be friends if they were to meet in the future.

Gameplay
The gameplay in Mega Man & Bass is similar to earlier games in the series. The player is tasked with completing a series of action-platform stages while overcoming obstacles, solving minor puzzles, and battling enemies. Destroying the "Robot Master" boss at the end of a stage lets the player acquire its special weapon. In previous games, the player generally took on the role of the hero Mega Man. In this game, the player can choose to start the game as either Mega Man or Bass. However, whichever character is picked must be used for the rest of the game and cannot be changed. Mega Man is able to charge his shots to make them more powerful and has the ability to slide along the ground. Bass is able to rapidly fire his arm cannon in eight directions, though shots cannot be fired while moving or pass through walls unless a certain upgrade is obtained. Bass is also able to double-jump (jump a second time in mid-air) and dash along the ground (similar to X in Mega Man X). Performing both simultaneously lets him cross great distances by doing a dash-jump.

The stage structure is different from other games in the series. After the introduction level, the player can only choose between three Robot Masters. Defeating Cold Man unlocks Burner Man and Pirate Man; defeating Astro Man unlocks Dynamo Man, Tengu Man, and Pirate Man; and defeating Ground Man unlocks Magic Man and Tengu Man. Clearing one of these unlocked stages opens the way to a security room where the player must destroy a series of crystals with obtained Robot Master weapons.  Bypassing all eight crystals opens the way to the fortress stages. In a similar fashion to previous installments in the series, enemies often drop bolts after they are destroyed, and these can be exchanged for various restorative items and upgrades.  However, unlike in Mega Man 7 the security cavern offers a way to obtain large amounts of bolts without having to repeatedly visit stages. Some upgrades are unique to either character, such as Mega Man's ability to call on his dog Rush to search for items, or an adaptor for Bass to combine with his wolf Treble to temporarily fly. Also distributed throughout the introduction and Robot Master levels are a collection of 100 data CDs that contain information on many prominent characters in the series. Most of the CDs are hidden either behind obstacles that need to be destroyed with a special weapon or accessed with a character-specific ability, making it impossible to collect them all on a single playthrough. CDs collected in each playthrough are permanently placed in a database and remain unlocked after beating the game. Saved games are used in place of the series' traditional password system.

Development
Mega Man & Bass was developed for the Super Famicom after the release of Mega Man 8, which preceded Mega Man & Bass on the two 32-bit consoles, the PlayStation and Sega Saturn. According to series producer Keiji Inafune, Mega Man & Bass was intended for younger players who still owned a Super Famicom and did not have the means to experience Mega Man 8 on one of the newer systems. "Even though trying to bridge out a new title on the [Super Famicom] was a little backwards at the time, we didn't want to make a half-hearted attempt at it," Inafune explained. The design team included several new employees, as well as members of previous Mega Man games. Inafune required them to make the game "as hardcore as possible". Designer Hideki Ishikawa recalled the development of Mega Man & Bass as "one big party". The staff attempted to create an original game while avoiding the "same old, same old [...] pitfall" that so many long video game series suffer and "had a lot of fun doing it".

Graphically, Mega Man & Bass uses many of the same two-dimensional sprites and animations as Mega Man 8. Two of the eight Robot Master bosses in Mega Man & Bass (Tengu Man and Astro Man) are borrowed from Mega Man 8. The other six were newly created for the game by three character designers: Hitoshi Ariga (credited as "H. Ariga"), Yoshihiro Iwamoto (credited as "Y. Iwamoto") and Koji Izuki (credited as "K. Iduki") designed two characters each. The bosses were officially unveiled on a teaser page in the Kodansha magazine Comic BonBon. Each boss was given distinct characteristics so that they could be easily identified by players in both their aesthetics and personalities. Some of these characters had different names during their conceptual phase prior to the finalization of the game. "Blast Man" became Burner Man, "Freezer Man" became Cold Man, and "Coil Man" became Dynamo Man. Iwamoto originally denoted Ground Man as "Drill Man" despite there already being a Robot Master by that name in Mega Man 4. The musical score for Mega Man & Bass was composed by Akari Kaida (credited as "A. Kaida"), Naoshi Mizuta (credited as "N. Mizuta"), and "Kirikiri-chan" (Toshihiko Horiyama). Rather than create tracks together, each composer was responsible for their own songs. Kaida would later work with other composers in the Mega Man series on the soundtrack for Mega Man 10, released in 2010.

Until its GBA re-release, it was one of the few Mega Man titles not localized for English-speaking countries. The company commemorated the 15th anniversary of the Mega Man franchise with the GBA version of the game.

Reception and legacy

The GBA port has received generally positive critical reviews, currently holding an aggregate score of 79% on both GameRankings and Metacritic. Most critics found the game to be a solid yet conventional action-platformer that successfully adheres to the classic Mega Man formula. Electronic Gaming Monthly summarized that Mega Man & Bass is "one of the best action games on GBA" and "a great, if slightly derivative, platformer" with plenty of replay value due to the collectible CDs. GamePro was pleased with the game's fidelity to its predecessors when compared to the deviations made by the Mega Man Battle Network and Mega Man Zero series on the same system. GameSpy contrarily criticized its lack of innovation, declaring, "Anyone that hasn't tried a Mega Man game yet would be better advised to spend $15 on a new copy of Mega Man 8 on the PSOne rather than paying $30 for an inferior retread of the same game".

Many reviews also noted the game's high difficulty. Both Giancarlo Varanini of GameSpot and Craig Harris of IGN found that the game's bosses have very unpredictable attack patterns, thus making the battles extremely challenging. Harris additionally observed a heavy amount of trial-and-error for the levels themselves where the player must die several times before completing each one. He concluded, "[...] It's really the way Mega Man games have always been... and to be honest, with all of the annoying little deaths in the game, there's always that sensation after every failure that you've learned the challenge, and perseverance definitely prevails in this game". Another criticism was to the fact that Mega Man, unlike in previous games, is unable to use the Rush Coil or the Rush Jet, making his movement options too limited and making platforming with him frustrating.

According to Famitsu, Mega Man & Bass for the GBA sold 91,097 copies in Japan between its release date and the week of December 23, 2002. A related game exclusive to Japan titled  was released for the WonderSwan handheld in 1999. The plot consists of the titular duo's struggle against an adversary named "Rockman Shadow". As Mega Man & Bass was released directly after Mega Man 8 and it shares plot and gameplay characteristics with the rest of the numbered titles in the series, many believed it to be the ninth main game in the series; however, the actual Mega Man 9 would not be released until 2008. Inafune explained in an interview with the Brazilian magazine Nintendo World that the ninth installment follows the storyline of Mega Man 8 and that the worlds for Mega Man & Bass and Mega Man 9 are meant to coincide with one another, as evidenced by a schematic of Bass in the ending of the game. In 2010, Bass was made playable via downloadable content in Mega Man 10. As in Mega Man & Bass, he is able to dash, fire in seven directions with his buster, and fly by combining with Treble. 

Nintendo Power listed Mega Man & Bass as the 14th best GBA game of all time in its 20th anniversary issue in 2008.

References
Notes

Sources

Further reading

External links

Official website 

1998 video games
Game Boy Advance games
Side-scrolling video games
Super Nintendo Entertainment System games
Video games developed in Japan
Virtual Console games
Virtual Console games for Wii U
Superhero video games
Action video games
Platform games
Mega Man games
Video games scored by Akari Kaida
Video games scored by Naoshi Mizuta
Video games set in amusement parks
Fiction about rebellions
Mega Man spin-off games